A.P.S. Zakynthos (Greek: Α.Π.Σ. Ζάκυνθος, Αθλητικός Ποδοσφαιρικός Σύλλογος Ζάκυνθος) is a Greek professional football club, based in Zakynthos, Greece. It was founded in 1961.

History

The club was officially founded in 1969 after the merger of two other local clubs, one of them founded in 1961, explaining the older foundation date on the team's logo.

The team had the chance to win promotion to Beta Ethniki in 1973 and in 1975 when they won the local championship of Ileia - Zakynthos, thus taking part to the Promotion Play-Offs against other local unions' champions from southern Greece.

However, they failed to be promoted, finishing in their promotion group's 2nd place both of the times while only the 1st teams of each Play - Off group were to be promoted.

From the middle of the 1970s until the early 1980s, the team was participating in a new amateur championship named "Ethniki Erasitechniki", which was the 3rd highest level of football at the time in Greece. It is also the first format of the today's Gamma Ethniki Championship. In 1982, the club was relegated to newly created, Greek 4th National Division and in 1987 when they were relegated to local championships.

The years that followed the club was constantly promoting and relegating between Delta Ethniki and Zakynthos' Local Championship.

Finally in 1997, they were able to avoid being relegated again from Delta Ethniki. In the years that followed they kept performing continuously in the league by regularly finishing in the top-half of the table.

In 2006, they were promoted for their first ever time to semi-professional Gamma Ethniki after winning the championship in Delta Ethniki's 6th Group.

However, their debut in the division was not ideal and they were relegated again in the 4th tier of Greece after finishing last in their group in 2006 - 2007 season.

They re-won the title in their group the next season, though, and were instantly repromoted to Gamma Ethniki were they stabilized.
In 2011- 2012 season the team achieved its highest ever position finishing 3rd in their group and competing in the promotion Play-Offs without success.

Beta Ethniki

After finishing 7th in the Northern Group of 2013 Gamma Ethniki Zakynthos was promoted to Beta Ethniki, being favoured by HFF's decision to increase the number of teams in the upper division, and the inability of a number of other clubs to support their participation to the upcoming Beta Ethniki season due to financial problems.
This led to an increased number of teams from the 3rd division being promoted with Zakynthos being amidst them, as it was made official in July 2013.

Zakynthos made their first Beta Ethniki appearance playing in the Northern Group where they finished 9th, managing to avoid relegation with ease. The next season it was the most successful in the team's history as they managed to finish 5th in their group, their highest position ever.

In the 2015-16 season, Beta Ethniki merged again in one group of 18 clubs with Zakynthos taking part for 3rd straight season in the division. However, the club experienced financial problems and they faced the deduction of 3 points that proved to be costly in their relegation battle. They ended up finishing 15th, just one point away from safety and they returned to amateur divisions.

To this day, the 2nd tier of Greece is the highest level of football that APS Zakynthos has ever competed.

Players

Current squad

Season to season

Honours
APS Zakynthos has traditionally been the strongest football club in the island of Zakynthos. They are the team with the most wins of the Zakynthos Local Championships' Top Division and domestic cup.

The club has also emerged as one of the best teams in the regions of the Ionian Islands and Western Greece during the last years, having won  the title twice in their regional group in Delta Ethniki.

 Fourth Division
 Winners (3): 2005-06, 2007-08, 2020-21
 Zakynthos Local Division
 Winners (5) – record: 1987-88, 1988-89, 1992-93, 1994-95, 1996-97
 Zakynthos Local Cup
 Winners (17) – record: 1987-88, 1989-90, 1990-91, 1991-92, 1992-93, 1993-94, 1995-96, 1996-97, 1997-98, 1998-99, 1999-00, 2001-02, 2002-03, 2003-04, 2004-05, 2006-07, 2007-08
 Elis Local Division
 Winners (3): 1972-73, 1974-75, 1978-79
 Elis Local Cup
 Winners (2): 1972-73, 1976-77

Notable players

  Stelios Liveris
  Stathis Karamalikis
  Thanasis Dinas
  Alexandros Apostolopoulos
  Tomasz Moskal
  Enes Rujović

External links 

 
 Team's news at ioniansports.gr
 Team's news at zantesport.gr

 
Association football clubs established in 1961
Zakynthos
Football clubs in Zakynthyos
Football clubs in the Ionian Islands (region)
1961 establishments in Greece
Super League Greece 2 clubs